The Orange Juice is the third and final studio album by Scottish post-punk band Orange Juice. It was released in 1984.The title was a tribute to The Velvet Underground's eponymous third album.

The album was released with free 12" single versions of several tracks on the cassette version, and it sold mostly in this format. The album was re-released on CD in 1998 and again in 2014.

Edwyn Collins used to dedicate the song "I Guess I'm Just a Little Too Sensitive" to Morrissey on the tour promoting this album.

Track listing
All tracks composed by Edwyn Collins
 "Lean Period"
 "I Guess I'm Just a Little Too Sensitive"
 "Burning Desire"
 "Scaremonger"
 "The Artisans"
 "What Presence?!"
 "Out for the Count"
 "Get While the Gettings Good"
 "All That Ever Mattered"
 "Salmon Fishing in New York"

Personnel
Orange Juice
 Edwyn Collins  – guitar, synthesizer, vocals
 Zeke Manyika – drums, vocals, percussion
with:
Clare Kenny – bass
Dennis Bovell – keyboards
Johnny Britton – guitar

References

1984 albums
The Orange Juice
Polydor Records albums